Monique Yazmin María "Nik" Quiríno Lagdaméo (born July 25, 1975) is a Filipino politician who is the Vice Mayor of Makati since 2016. She previously served as a member of the Philippine House of Representatives representing Makati's first district from 2010 to 2016.

Early life
Lagdaméo was born on July 25, 1975, to Militza Quiríno and Enrique Lagdaméo. She is a granddaughter of Antonio Quiríno and a great-niece of President Elpídio Quiríno. She graduated Bachelor of Science in commerce (Legal Management) from De La Salle University in 1995.

Political life
Lagdaméo entered politics in 1992 as a member of the Sangguniang Kabataan (SK) council of Barangay Forbes Park, Makati. In 1996, she then became the SK Chair, holding the position until 2002. Concurrently, from 2001 to 2002, she was named as the SK Federation Chairperson for Makati, a sectoral representative position on the Makati City Council. She would then become the Consultant of the SK Federation from 2002 to 2003.

In 2004, she was elected as the City Councilor of Makati from the 1st district. She was then re-elected in 2007.

In 2010, she was elected Representative of Makati's 1st District, succeeding Teodoro Locsin Jr., running under the PDP–Laban party. She was then re-elected in 2013, this time under the United Nationalist Alliance.

In the wake of Junjun Binay's ouster as Makati mayor by the Ombudsman of the Philippines in 2015, Lagdaméo announced her candidacy as Vice Mayor of Makati running with fellow Cong. Abigail Binay as Mayor of the city competing with the tandem of Romulo "Kid" Peña Jr. and Karla Mercado. On May 9, 2016, Lagdaméo alongside Abigail Binay, won the vice-mayoral and mayoral elections, respectively. Took their oath of office on June 27, 2016. Lagdaméo's first day as Vice Mayor of Makati began three days later on June 30. As a result, the Binay-Lagdaméo tandem became the first female duo to head as Mayor and Vice Mayor respectively.

In July 2022, Lagdameo was named as the President of the Vice Mayors League for the National Capital Region, succeeding former Caloocan Vice Mayor Luis Macario "Maca" Asistio.

References

External links
Profile - Makati Official Website

1975 births
Living people
Members of the House of Representatives of the Philippines from Makati
PDP–Laban politicians
United Nationalist Alliance politicians
Metro Manila city and municipal councilors
People from Makati
De La Salle University alumni
Quirino family